The Party Tour was the debut concert tour by American recording artist, Pink. The tour supported her second studio album Missundaztood (2001).

Background
While promoting her second studio album, Missundaztood, Pink stated she was proud of the "new" sound of the record and was ready to go on the road with her new band. Planning the tour, Pink was given complete control of all aspects of the tour including staging and opening acts. During an interview at the ESPY Awards, Pink mentioned she chose the group "Candy Ass" because she'd always wanted to be in an all-female band. She further stated that she would cover songs by her musical inspirations including 4 Non Blondes, Aerosmith, Janis Joplin, Guns N' Roses and Mary J. Blige.

The stage was very simplistic consisting of a backdrop resembling a brick wall with a graffiti text saying "P!nk", a video screen, lights, instruments, and one microphone. The show's setup was designed for the nightclubs and concert halls Pink would play that had an average audience size of 3,000 attendees. During this time, Pink's peers Britney Spears and Christina Aguilera were touring the U.S. as well in sports arenas and amphitheaters. Pink (who previously condemned the comparisons) stated:

"Big productions, to me, are great—like, I love going to Vegas and seeing shows—but I think that sometimes it's distracting, especially when you are there to listen to the music. I remember being on tour with 'NSYNC, and I don't know if this is appropriate, but it was something like a $5 million stage, and to me, that was just like, 'Man, I will take a box out there and stand on it with a microphone. I ain't spending that much money.' I love the shows that are in dingy little dark clubs, smoky, no production whatsoever. My stage show is raw and unpredictable. It's not a lot of choreography this time. There's practically no sequencing involved whatsoever. It's just instruments and a voice and incredible music. When there is a lot of sequencing or ProTools or DATs involved, it gets a little strange, so this is going to be definitely more organic."

During rehearsals, Pink contacted Lenny Kravitz and jokingly stated she was rehearsing to be the opening act on his upcoming North American tour. She invited the rock singer to watch her rehearse. She also sent him a pair of black and pink panties with "The P!nk/Lenny Tour" written on them. Upon the completion of her North America dates, Pink continued to tour the United States as the opening act for the "Lenny Live Tour". Once her outing with Kravitz was complete, the singer set out on a mini-tour of Europe, visiting England, Ireland and Germany. She continued her tour into Japan and New Zealand before touring Australia with the "Rumba Festival".

The tour was sponsored by Bally Total Fitness, giving the tour the sponsored name, "Bally Total Fitness presents Pink's 'The Party Tour 2002'". In conjunction with the sponsorship, the fitness center launched the "Get Your Body Started" movement classes in over 400 Ballys throughout the US and Canada. The centers also hosted dance competitions set to Missundaztood.

Opening acts
Candy Ass (North America)
The Kennedy Soundtrack 
Lucky 7 (Honolulu)

Setlist
The following setlist was obtained from the concert held on June 1, 2002, at the Tower Theater in Upper Darby Township, Pennsylvania. It does not represent all concerts for the duration of the tour
"Instrumental Sequence" (contains elements of "Most Girls")
"Get the Party Started"
"Missundaztood"
"18 Wheeler"
"What's Up?"
"Dear Diary"
"Respect"
"I Love You" / "You're All I Need to Get By"
"Janie's Got a Gun"
"You Make Me Sick"
"Just Like a Pill"
"Lonely Girl" 
"Instrumental Sequence" (contains elements of "Sweet Child o' Mine")
"Numb"
"Summertime" / "Piece of My Heart" / "Me and Bobby McGee"
"Family Portrait"
"My Vietnam" (contains elements of "The Star-Spangled Banner")
Encore
"Eventually"
"There You Go"
"Don't Let Me Get Me"

Tour dates

Festivals and other miscellaneous performances 
This concert was a part of "Zootopia"
This concert was a part of "Wango Tango"
These concerts were a part of "Rumba Festival"

Box office score data

Critical reception
Overall, the tour received high praise from critics. Many noted Pink's raw energy displayed during her concerts, taking the audience on a musical roller coaster of R&B, rock and pop music. Some critics drew comparisons of the Philadelphia singer to Madonna. Robin Vaughn (The Boston Phoenix) writes, "Chrissie Hynde she's not, but somewhere between Shirley Manson and Madonna, Pink's rock-star niche is a natural. Pink's material may not be revolutionary art, but revolution, however vaguely imagined, was clearly a theme. She gave the girls some grown-up stuff to think about, and it wasn’t heavy on how to be a 21st-century bimbo". Christina Fuoco commented on Pink's performance at Phoenix's Web Theatre stating, "She was playful, holding the microphone over the crowd to let them sing the chorus of "There You Go", one of the few tunes from Can't Take Me Home she played. The playfulness segued to visual irritation when a fan threw a tampon on stage as a gift.". A staff writer for NME writes, "All of which would amount to sweet FA, of course, if it wasn't for the fact that she also happens to have authored three of this year's greatest pop songs. Anyone whose pulse doesn't race to the set opener, 'Get The Party Started' might as well be dead. 'Just Like A Pill' is a gem that manages to ride its chic innuendo into real realms of romantic suffering and 'Dear Diary' is a sweet liaison between Madonna's 'Don't Tell Me' and The Verve 'The Drugs Don't Work'".

Personnel
Production
Lighting Designer: Ethan Weber
Lighting Technicians: Adam Finer and Marty Langley
Production Manager: Ian Kinnersley

Band
Keyboards: Jason Chapman and Cassandra O'Neal
Drums: Mylious Johnson
Guitar: Rafael Moriera
Bass guitar: Janis Tanaka
Backing vocalist: Cassandra O'Neal and Janis Tanaka

External links
 Official Website

References

Pink (singer) concert tours
2002 concert tours
Concert tours of Asia
Concert tours of Australia
Concert tours of Canada
Concert tours of Europe
Concert tours of Germany
Concert tours of Ireland
Concert tours of Japan
Concert tours of New Zealand
Concert tours of North America
Concert tours of Oceania
Concert tours of the United Kingdom
Concert tours of the United States